Herieth Paul (born December 14, 1995) is a Tanzanian model who has walked for Diane von Fürstenberg, Lacoste, Tom Ford, Calvin Klein, Armani, Cavalli and 3.1 Phillip Lim. She moved to Ottawa, Ontario, Canada at the age of 14 due to her mother being a diplomat. She was discovered when she went to an open call at Angie's AMTI, a model agency based in Ottawa, Ontario, Canada. She signed with Women Management New York in June 2010. Paul has appeared in editorials for Vogue Italia magazine, i-D, wonderland and Teen Vogue. Paul appeared on a Vogue Italia cover with Arizona Muse and Freja Beha. In July 2011 she was the cover model of Canadian Elle. The caption on the cover read: "Naomi Move Over . Why We're Hot For Herieth." Paul was one of three models in the Tom Ford Fall/Winter 2013 campaign, photographed by Tom Ford. This campaign was named one of the top ten campaigns of Fall 2013 by The Business of Fashion and by Racked.com. In 2016 Herieth signed a contract with Maybelline New York cosmetics company and she is now known as one of the brand's global spokespeople.

Personal life
Paul's mother, Nsia Paul is a diplomat at the Tanzania High Commission Ottawa. She has a sister named Happiness Floyd  

Since the end of 2018, she has been in a relationship with the South Sudanese model, Monywiir Deng Dharjang, who in May 2020 announced that they were expecting a child, in which on February 10, 2021, Paul and Dharjang on their Instagram account of the first, they welcomed their son Riael.

References

External links
 
 
 Herieth Paul at Models.com
 2011 Ottawa Citizen Interview
 2013 Ottawa Citizen Style Interview
 Interview with Bella Sugar 

1995 births
Living people
Tanzanian female models
People from Dar es Salaam
Women Management models
Tanzanian emigrants to Canada